Villa Tulumaya is a town in Mendoza Province, Argentina. It is the head town of Lavalle Department.

The town was founded on October 20, 1853.

External links

 Municipal website

Populated places in Mendoza Province